Diego Rodriguez is an American attorney and politician who served as a member of the Arizona House of Representatives for the 27th district from 2019 to 2021. He was elected in 2018 to succeed State Representative Rebecca Rios, who instead ran for the Arizona Senate.

Rodriguez graduated from the University of Notre Dame, and eventually relocated to Arizona, where he graduated from the James E. Rogers College of Law and later started his own law firm. In 2021, he resigned from the House and declared his candidacy for the 2022 Arizona Attorney General election. He announced he was withdrawing from the Attorney General election on April 1, 2022.

References

External links
 
 Diego Rodriguez for Arizona Attorney General campaign website

Year of birth missing (living people)
Living people
University of Notre Dame alumni
Hispanic and Latino American state legislators in Arizona
Democratic Party members of the Arizona House of Representatives
21st-century American politicians